Bolshaya Rukavitskaya is a rural locality (a village) in Semizerye Rural Settlement, Kaduysky District, Vologda Oblast, Russia. The population was 24 as of 2002.

Geography 
Bolshaya Rukavitskaya is located 4 km southeast of Kaduy (the district's administrative centre) by road. Malaya Rukavitskaya is the nearest rural locality.

References 

Rural localities in Kaduysky District